Robert Bruce Bowers (1 March 1897 in Lambeg, County Antrim – 25 November 1956 in Belfast) was an Irish cricketer. A right-handed batsman and right-arm medium pace bowler, he played just once for Ireland, a first-class match against Wales in June 1926.

References
CricketEurope Stats Zone profile
Cricket Archive profile
Cricinfo profile

1897 births
1956 deaths
Irish cricketers
People from County Antrim
Cricketers from Northern Ireland